Uttar Pradesh Urdu Akademi  also known as Uttar Pradesh Urdu Academy or Urdu Academy, Uttar Pradesh (Urdu: اردو اکادمی، اتر پردیش) in the interest of developing the Urdu language and preserving the Urdu tradition and culture it was established in January 1972. It is under control of the Ministry of Minorities affairs.

History
The then Uttar Pradesh government established this academy under registration of society's act  with a motto of establishing an Urdu institution to look after the development of the Urdu language, literature, cultural heritage. This institution has compiled many programs in its fold for cultural and educational goals. Office of this academy is situated in Lucknow city.

Activities
The functions of UP Urdu Academy are specified in the memorandum of association of the constitution of Urdu Academy, registered under the Uttar Pradesh Public societies Registration Act.

 Publication, translation and printing of the text books and reference books.
 Research work, festivals, seminars, symposiums, mushairas and state level important events.
 Giving scholarships to the deserving and meritorious students. 
 Conducting Coaching classes for the competitive examinations.
 Honouring the literary personalities, awarding prizes, awards etc.

Publications

References

Organisations based in Lucknow
Linguistic research institutes in India
Urdu Academies in India
1975 establishments in Uttar Pradesh
Educational institutions established in 1975